Alexander Meigs Haig Jr. (December 2, 1924February 20, 2010) was United States Secretary of State under President Ronald Reagan and White House Chief of Staff under Presidents Richard Nixon and Gerald Ford. Prior to and in between these cabinet-level positions, he was a general in the United States Army, serving first as the vice chief of staff of the Army and then as Supreme Allied Commander Europe. In 1973, Haig became the youngest four-star general in the U.S. Army's history.

Born in Bala Cynwyd, Pennsylvania, Haig served in the Korean War after graduating from the United States Military Academy. In the Korean War, he served as an aide to General Alonzo Patrick Fox and General Edward Almond. After the war, he served as an aide to Secretary of Defense Robert McNamara. During the Vietnam War, Haig commanded a battalion and later a brigade of the 1st Infantry Division. For his service, Haig was a recipient of the Distinguished Service Cross, the Silver Star with oak leaf cluster and the Purple Heart.

In 1969 Haig became an assistant to National Security Adviser Henry Kissinger. He became vice chief of staff of the Army, the second-highest-ranking position in the Army, in 1972. After the 1973 resignation of H. R. Haldeman, Haig became President Nixon's chief of staff. Serving in the wake of the Watergate scandal, he became especially influential in the final months of Nixon's tenure; he played a role in persuading Nixon to resign in August 1974. Haig continued to serve as chief of staff for the first month of President Ford's tenure. From 1974 to 1979, Haig served as Supreme Allied Commander Europe, commanding all NATO forces in Europe. He retired from the army in 1979 and pursued a career in business.

After Reagan won the 1980 United States presidential election, he nominated Haig to be his secretary of state. After the attempted assassination of Ronald Reagan, Haig said "I am in control here", allegedly suggesting (erroneously since the Presidential Succession Act of 1947, when the Speaker of the House of Representatives was designated the second in the line of succession after the vice president) that he served as acting U.S. president in Reagan's and Bush's absence, later iterating that he meant that he was functionally in control of the government. During the Falklands War, Haig sought to broker peace between the United Kingdom and Argentina. He resigned from Reagan's cabinet in July 1982. After leaving office, he unsuccessfully sought the presidential nomination in the 1988 Republican Party presidential primaries. He also served as the head of a consulting firm and hosted the television program World Business Review.

Early life and education
Haig was born in Bala Cynwyd, Pennsylvania, the middle of three children of Alexander Meigs Haig, a Republican lawyer of Scottish descent, and his wife, Regina Anne (née Murphy). When Haig was 9, his father, aged 41, died of cancer. His Irish American mother raised her children in the Catholic faith. Haig initially attended Saint Joseph's Preparatory School in Philadelphia, Pennsylvania, on scholarship; when it was withdrawn due to poor academic performance, he transferred to Lower Merion High School in Ardmore, Pennsylvania, from which he graduated in 1942.

Initially unable to secure his desired appointment to the United States Military Academy (with one teacher opining that "Al is definitely not West Point material"), Haig studied at the University of Notre Dame (where he reportedly earned a "string of A's" in an "intellectual awakening") for two years before securing a congressional appointment to the academy in 1944 at the behest of his uncle, who served as the Philadelphia municipal government's director of public works.

Enrolled in an accelerated wartime curriculum that deemphasized the humanities and social sciences, Haig graduated in the bottom third of his class (ranked 214 of 310) in 1947. Although a West Point superintendent characterized Haig as "the last man in his class anyone expected to become the first general", other classmates acknowledged his "strong convictions and even stronger ambitions". Haig later earned an M.B.A. from the Columbia Business School in 1955 and an M.A. in international relations from Georgetown University in 1961. His thesis for the latter degree examined the role of military officers in making national policy.

Early military career

Korean War
As a young officer, Haig served as an aide to Lieutenant General Alonzo Patrick Fox, a deputy chief of staff to General Douglas MacArthur. In 1950 Haig married Fox's daughter, Patricia. In the early days of the Korean War, Haig was responsible for maintaining General MacArthur's situation map and briefing MacArthur each evening on the day's battlefield events. Haig later served (1950–51) with the X Corps, as aide to MacArthur's chief of staff, General Edward Almond, who awarded Haig two Silver Stars and a Bronze Star with Valor device. Haig participated in four Korean War campaigns, including the Battle of Inchon, the Battle of Chosin Reservoir and the evacuation of Hŭngnam, as Almond's aide.

Pentagon assignments
Haig served as a staff officer in the Office of the Deputy Chief of Staff for Operations at the Pentagon (1962–64), and then was appointed military assistant to Secretary of the Army Stephen Ailes in 1964. He then was appointed military assistant to Secretary of Defense Robert McNamara, continuing in that service until the end of 1965.  In 1966, Haig graduated from the United States Army War College.

Vietnam War

In 1966 Haig took command of a battalion of the 1st Infantry Division during the Vietnam War. On May 22, 1967, Lieutenant Colonel Haig was awarded the Distinguished Service Cross, the U.S. Army's second highest medal for valor, by General William Westmoreland as a result of his actions during the Battle of Ap Gu in March 1967.  During the battle, Haig's troops (of the 1st Battalion, 26th Infantry Regiment) became pinned down by a Viet Cong force that outnumbered U.S. forces by three to one. In an attempt to survey the battlefield, Haig boarded a helicopter and flew to the point of contact. His helicopter was subsequently shot down. Two days of bloody hand-to-hand combat ensued. An excerpt from Haig's official Army citation follows:

Haig was also awarded the Distinguished Flying Cross and the Purple Heart during his tour in Vietnam and was eventually promoted to colonel as commander of 2nd Brigade, 1st Infantry Division in Vietnam.

Return to West Point
Following his one-year Vietnam tour, Haig returned to the United States to become regimental commander of the Third Regiment of the Corps of Cadets at West Point under the newly appointed commandant, Brigadier General Bernard W. Rogers. Both had previously served together in the 1st Infantry Division, Rogers as assistant division commander and Haig as brigade commander.

Security adviser and vice chief of staff (1969–1973)
In 1969, he was appointed military assistant to the assistant to the president for national security affairs, Henry Kissinger. A year later, he replaced Richard V. Allen as deputy assistant to the president for national security affairs. During this period, he was promoted to brigadier general (September 1969) and major general (March 1972).

In this position, Haig helped South Vietnamese president Nguyen Van Thieu negotiate the final cease-fire talks in 1972. Haig continued in the role until January 4, 1973, when he became vice chief of staff of the Army. Nixon planned to appoint Haig as chief of staff over Creighton Abrams, who he personally disliked, but secretary of defense Melvin Laird resisted as Haig lacked the relevant upper-level command experience. He was confirmed by the U.S. Senate in October 1972, thus skipping the rank of lieutenant general. By appointing him to this billet, Nixon "passed over 240 generals" who were senior to Haig.

White House Chief of Staff (1973–1974)

Nixon administration

After only four months as VCSA, Haig returned to the Nixon administration at the height of the Watergate affair as White House chief of staff in May 1973. Retaining his Army commission, he remained in the position until September 21, 1974, ultimately overseeing the transition to the presidency of Gerald Ford following Nixon's resignation on August 9, 1974.

Haig has been largely credited with keeping the government running while President Nixon was preoccupied with Watergate and was essentially seen as the "acting president" during Nixon's last few months in office. During July and early August 1974, Haig played an instrumental role in finally persuading Nixon to resign. Haig presented several pardon options to Ford a few days before Nixon eventually resigned. In this regard, in his 1999 book Shadow, author Bob Woodward describes Haig's role as the point man between Nixon and Ford during the final days of Nixon's presidency. According to Woodward, Haig played a major behind-the-scenes role in the delicate negotiations of the transfer of power from President Nixon to President Ford. Indeed, about one month after taking office, Ford did pardon Nixon, resulting in much controversy.

However, Haig denied the allegation that he played a key role in arbitrating Nixon's resignation by offering Ford's pardon to Nixon. One of the most crucial moments occurred a day before Haig's departure to Europe to begin his tenure as NATO Supreme Allied Commander. Haig was telephoned by J. Fred Buzhardt who once served as special White House counsel for Watergate matters. In the call, Buzhardt discussed with Haig President Ford's upcoming speech to address the nation about pardoning former president Richard Nixon, informing Haig that the speech contained something indicating Haig's role in Nixon's resignation and Ford's pardon of Nixon. According to his autobiography (Inner Circles: How America Changed the World), Haig was furious and immediately drove straight to the White House to determine the veracity of Buzhardt's claims. This was due to his concern that Ford's speech would expose his role in negotiating Nixon's resignation supposedly in exchange for a pardon issued by the newly sworn in president.

On August 7, 1974, two days before Nixon's resignation, Haig met with Nixon in the Oval Office to discuss the transition. Following their conversation, Nixon told Haig "You fellows, in your business, have a way of handling problems like this. Give them a pistol and leave the room. 
I don't have a pistol, Al."

Ford administration
Following Nixon's resignation, Haig remained briefly as White House Chief of Staff under President Ford. Haig aided in the transition by advising the new president mostly on policy matters on which he had been working under the Nixon presidency and introducing Ford to the White House staff and their daily activities. Haig recommended that Ford retain several of Nixon's White House staff for 30 days to provide an orderly transition from the old administration to the new. Haig and Kissinger also advised President Ford on Nixon's détente policy with the Soviet Union following the SALT I treaty in 1972.

Haig found it difficult to get along with the new administration and wanted to return to the Army for his last command. It had also been rumored that Ford wanted to be his own chief of staff. At first Ford decided to replace Haig with Robert T. Hartmann, Ford's chief of staff during his tenure as vice president. Ford soon replaced Hartmann with United States Permanent Ambassador to NATO Donald Rumsfeld. Author and Haig biographer Roger Morris, a former colleague of Haig's on the National Security Council early in Nixon's first term, wrote that when Ford pardoned Nixon, he in effect pardoned Haig as well.

Haig resigned from his position as White House Chief of Staff and returned to active-duty in the United States Army in September 1974.

NATO Supreme Allied Commander (1974–1979)

In December 1974, Haig was appointed as the next Supreme Allied Commander Europe by President Gerald Ford replacing General Andrew Goodpaster  and returning to active duty within the United States Army. General Haig also became the top runner to be the 27th U.S. Army Chief of Staff, following the death of Army Chief of Staff General Creighton Abrams from complications of surgery to remove lung cancer on September 4, 1974. However it was General Frederick C. Weyand who ultimately filled Abrams's position as Army Chief of Staff instead of General Haig. From 1974 to 1979 General Haig served as the Supreme Allied Commander Europe, the commander of NATO forces in Europe, as well as commander in chief of United States European Command. During his tenure as SACEUR, General Haig focused on transforming SACEUR in order to face the future global challenge following the end of the Vietnam War and the rise of Soviet influence within Eastern Europe.

Haig focused on strengthening the relationship between the United States and NATO member nations and their allies. As a result, several fleets of United States Air Force aircraft, such as the F-111 Aardvark from the Strategic Air Command, were relocated to U.S. Air Force bases located in Europe. Haig also stressed the importance of increasing the training of U.S. troops deployed in Europe following his tour of the Sixth Fleet in the Mediterranean Sea, on which Haig saw poorly-disciplined and ill-trained troops. As a result, Haig conducted routine inspections during NATO troops' training and often went to the training site and participated in the training itself. Haig also recommended the revitalization of the equipment within the United States installations in Europe and U.S. troops deployed in Europe, in order to strengthen deterrence from possible attack within Western Europe.

Haig took the same route to SHAPE every day—a pattern of behavior that did not go unnoticed by terrorist organizations. On June 25, 1979, Haig was the target of an assassination attempt in Mons, Belgium. A land mine blew up under the bridge on which Haig's car was traveling, narrowly missing Haig's car and wounding three of his bodyguards in a following car. Authorities later attributed responsibility for the attack to the Red Army Faction (RAF). In 1993 a German court sentenced Rolf Clemens Wagner, a former RAF member, to life imprisonment for the assassination attempt. During Haig's last month of tenure as Supreme Allied Commander Europe, Haig oversaw the talks and negotiation between United States and NATO member nations of a new policy following the signing of SALT II Treaty on June 18, 1979, by President Jimmy Carter and Soviet Premier Leonid Brezhnev. However Haig also drew concern regarding the SALT II Treaty in which, in accordance to Haig it's only benefited the Soviet position and gave them a way to build up their military arsenal. Haig grew more concerned about the treaty following the Soviet invasion of Afghanistan, in which Haig argued that the invasion was part of the Soviet campaign to strengthen their military buildup expansion.

Haig retired from his position as the Supreme Allied Commander Europe in July 1979 and was succeeded by General Bernard W. Rogers whom previously served as Army Chief of Staff. Haig retirement ceremony took place on NATO Supreme Headquarters Allied Powers Europe in Mons, Belgium on July 1, 1979, attended by Secretary of Defense Harold Brown, NATO Secretary General Joseph Luns and U.S. Ambassador to NATO William Tapley Bennett Jr.

Civilian positions
Haig retired as a four-star general from the Army in 1979, and moved on to civilian employment. In 1979 he worked at the Philadelphia-based Foreign Policy Research Institute briefly and later served on that organization's board.

Later that year, he was named president and director of United Technologies Corporation under chief executive officer Harry J. Gray, a job he retained until 1981.

Secretary of State (1981–1982)

Haig was the second of three career military officers to become secretary of state (George C. Marshall and Colin Powell were the others). His speeches in this role in particular led to the coining of the neologism "Haigspeak," described in a dictionary of neologisms as "Language characterized by pompous obscurity resulting from redundancy, the semantically strained use of words, and verbosity," leading Ambassador Nicko Henderson to offer a prize for the best rendering of the Gettysburg Address in Haigspeak.

Initial challenges
On December 11, 1980, president-elect Reagan was prepared to publicly announce nearly all of his candidates for the most important cabinet-level posts. Singularly absent from the list of top nominees was his choice for Secretary of State, presumed by many at the time to be Alexander Haig. Haig's prospects for Senate confirmation were clouded when Senate Democrats questioned his role in the Watergate scandal. In Haig's defense, North Carolina Senator Jesse Helms claimed to have phoned former president Nixon personally to inquire whether any material on Nixon's unreleased White House tapes could embarrass Haig. According to Helms, Nixon replied, "Not a thing." Haig was eventually confirmed after hearings he described as an "ordeal," during which he received no encouragement from Reagan or his staff.Several days earlier, on December 2, 1980, as Haig faced these initial challenges to the next step in his political career, four U.S. Catholic missionary women in El Salvador, two of whom were Maryknoll sisters, were beaten, raped and murdered by five Salvadoran national guardsmen ordered to follow them. Their bodies were exhumed from a remote shallow grave two days later in the presence of then-U.S. ambassador to El Salvador Robert E. White. Despite this diplomatically awkward atrocity, the Carter administration soon approved $5.9 million in lethal military assistance to El Salvador's oppressive right-wing government. The incoming Reagan administration expanded that aid to $25 million less than six weeks later.

In justifying the arms shipments, the new administration claimed that the Salvadoran government of José Napoleón Duarte had taken "positive steps" to investigate the murder of four American nuns, but this was disputed by U.S. Ambassador Robert E. White, who said that he could find no evidence the junta was "conducting a serious investigation." White was dismissed from the Foreign Service by Haig because of his complaints. White later asserted that the Reagan administration was determined to ignore and even conceal the complicity of the Salvadoran government and army in the murders.

Throughout the 1980 U.S. presidential campaign, Reagan and his foreign policy advisers faulted the Carter administration's perceived over-emphasis on the human rights abuses committed by authoritarian governments allied to the U.S., labeling it a "double standard" when compared with Carter's treatment of communist-bloc governments. Haig, who described himself as the "vicar" of U.S. foreign policy, believed the human rights violations of a U.S. ally such as El Salvador should be given less attention than the ally's successes against enemies of the U.S., and thus found himself diminishing the murders of the nuns before the House Foreign Affairs Committee in March 1981:

The outcry that immediately followed Haig's insinuation prompted him to emphatically withdraw his speculative suggestions the very next day before the Senate Foreign Relations Committee. Similar public relations miscalculations, by Haig and others, continued to plague the Reagan administration's attempts to build popular support at home for its Central American policies.

Reagan assassination attempt: 'I am in control here'

In 1981, following the March 30 assassination attempt on Reagan, Haig asserted before reporters, "I am in control here" as a result of Reagan's hospitalization, indicating that, while President Reagan had not "transfer[red] the helm," Haig was in fact directing White House crisis management until Vice President George Bush arrived in Washington to assume that role.

The U.S. Constitution, including both the presidential line of succession and the 25th Amendment, dictates what happens when a president is incapacitated. The Speaker of the House (at the time, Tip O'Neill, Democrat) and the president pro tempore of the Senate (at the time, Strom Thurmond, Republican), precede the secretary of state in the line of succession. Haig later clarified,

Falklands War

In April 1982, Haig conducted shuttle diplomacy between the governments of Argentina in Buenos Aires and the United Kingdom in London after Argentina invaded the Falkland Islands. Negotiations collapsed and Haig returned to Washington on April 19. The British naval fleet then entered the war zone. In December 2012 documents released under the United Kingdom's 30 Year Rule disclosed that Haig planned to reveal British classified military information to Argentina in advance of the recapture of South Georgia Island. The information, which contained the plans for Operation Paraquet, was intended to show the Argentine military junta in Buenos Aires that the United States was a neutral player and could be trusted to act impartially during negotiations to end the conflict. However, in 2012 it was revealed via declassified files from the Reagan Presidential Library that Haig attempted to persuade Reagan to side with Argentina in the war.

1982 Lebanon War

Haig's report to Reagan on January 30, 1982, shows that Haig feared the Israelis might start a war against Lebanon. Critics accused Haig of "greenlighting" the Israeli invasion of Lebanon in June 1982. Haig denied this and said he urged restraint.

Resignation
Haig caused some alarm with his suggestion that a "nuclear warning shot" in Europe might be effective in deterring the Soviet Union. His tenure as secretary of state was often characterized by his clashes with the defense secretary, Caspar Weinberger. Haig, who repeatedly had difficulty with various members of the Reagan administration during his year-and-a-half in office, decided to resign his post on June 25, 1982. President Reagan accepted his resignation on July 5. Haig was succeeded by George P. Shultz, who was confirmed on July 16.

1988 Republican presidential primaries

Haig ran unsuccessfully for the 1988 Republican Party presidential nomination. Although he enjoyed relatively high name recognition, Haig never broke out of single digits in national public opinion polls. He was a fierce critic of then–Vice President George H. W. Bush, often doubting Bush's leadership abilities, questioning his role in the Iran–Contra affair, and using the word "wimp" in relation to Bush in an October 1987 debate in Texas. Despite extensive personal campaigning and paid advertising in New Hampshire, Haig remained stuck in last place in the polls. After finishing with less than 1 percent of the vote in the Iowa caucuses and trailing badly in the New Hampshire primary polls, Haig withdrew his candidacy and endorsed Senator Bob Dole.  Dole, steadily gaining on Bush after beating him handily a week earlier in the Iowa caucus, ended up losing to Bush in the New Hampshire primary by 10 percentage points. With his momentum regained, Bush easily won the nomination.

Later life, health, and death

In 1980 Haig had a double heart bypass operation.

After leaving the Reagan White House, Haig took a seat on the MGM board of directors in an effort to cultivate a film career. He supervised the development of John Milius' Red Dawn (1984) and made significant changes to it. While heading a consulting firm in the 1980s and 1990s, he served as a director for various struggling businesses, including computer manufacturer Commodore International. He also served as a founding corporate director of America Online.

Haig was the host for several years of the television program World Business Review. At the time of his death, he was the host of 21st Century Business, with each program a weekly business education forum that included business solutions, expert interview, commentary, and field reports. Haig was co-chairman of the American Committee for Peace in the Caucasus, along with Zbigniew Brzezinski and Stephen J. Solarz. He was also member of the Washington Institute for Near East Policy (WINEP) board of advisers.

On January 5, 2006, Haig participated in a meeting at the White House of former secretaries of defense and state to discuss U.S. foreign policy with Bush administration officials. On May 12, 2006, Haig participated in a second White House meeting with 10 former secretaries of state and defense. The meeting included briefings by Donald Rumsfeld and Condoleezza Rice and was followed by a discussion with President George W. Bush. Haig's memoirs—Inner Circles: How America Changed The World—were published in 1992.

On February 19, 2010, a hospital spokesman revealed that the 85-year-old Haig had been hospitalized at Johns Hopkins Hospital in Baltimore since January 28 and remained in critical condition. On February 20, Haig died at the age of 85, from complications from a staphylococcal infection that he had prior to admission. According to The New York Times, his brother, Frank Haig, said the Army was coordinating a mass at Fort Myer in Washington and an interment at Arlington National Cemetery, but both had to be delayed by about two weeks owing to the wars in Afghanistan and Iraq. A Mass of Christian Burial was held at the Basilica of the National Shrine of the Immaculate Conception in Washington, D.C., on March 2, 2010. Eulogies were given by Henry Kissinger and Sherwood D. Goldberg.

President Barack Obama said in a statement that "General Haig exemplified our finest warrior–diplomat tradition of those who dedicate their lives to public service." Secretary of State Hillary Clinton described Haig as a man who "served his country in many capacities for many years, earning honor on the battlefield, the confidence of presidents and prime ministers, and the thanks of a grateful nation."

Family
Alexander Haig was married to Patricia (née Fox), with whom he had three children: Alexander Patrick Haig, Barbara Haig, and Brian Haig. Haig's younger brother, Frank Haig, is a Jesuit priest and professor emeritus of physics at Loyola University in Baltimore, Maryland.

Publications
Articles
"Introduction". World Affairs, Vol. 144, No. 4, Statements by Ambassador Max Kampelman before the Madrid Conference on Security and Cooperation in Europe, Spring 1982.  (pp. 299–301)
"Stalemate: The Public Reaction to Poland". World Affairs, Vol. 144, No. 4, Statements by Ambassador Max Kampelman before the Madrid Conference on Security and Cooperation in Europe, Spring 1982.  (pp. 467–511)
 "U.S. Foreign Policy: A Discussion with Former Secretaries of State Dean Rusk, William P. Rogers, Cyrus R. Vance, and Alexander M. Haig, Jr.". International Studies Notes, Vol. 11, No. 1, Special Edition: The Secretaries of State, Fall 1984.  (pp. 10–20)
"Reply". Journal of Interamerican Studies and World Affairs, Vol. 27, No. 2, Summer 1985.   (pp. 23–24)
"The Challenges to American Leadership". Harvard International Review, Vol. 11, No. 3, Tenth Anniversary Issue – American Foreign Policy: Toward the 1990s, 1989.  (pp. 24–29)
"Nation Building: A Flawed Approach". The Brown Journal of World Affairs, Vol. 2, No. 1, Winter 1994.  (pp. 7–10)

Books
 Caveat: Realism, Reagan and Foreign Affairs. New York, NY: Macmillan Publishing Company, 1984. . 367 pages.
Inner Circles: How America Changed the World: A Memoir. New York, NY: Warner Books, 1992.  . 650 pages.

Contributed works
"Foreword". Soviet Leaders from Lenin to Gorbachev by Thomas Streissguth. Minneapolis, MN: Oliver Press, 1992.   (pp. 7–8)

Awards and decorations
Haig's awards and decorations include:

Other honors
1976, Golden Plate Award of the American Academy of Achievement.

2009, General and Mrs. Haig were recognized for their generous gift in support of academic programs at West Point by being inducted into the Eisenhower Society for Lifetime Giving.

References

Further reading
 Colodny, Len and Robert Gettlin. Silent Coup: The Removal of a President. New York City: St. Martin's Press, 1991.
 Haig, Alexander. Caveat: Realism, Reagan and Foreign Affairs. New York City: Macmillan Publishing Company, 1984.
 Haig, Alexander and Charles McCarry. Inner Circles: How America Changed the World. Grand Central Publishing, 2 January 1994.
 Hersh, Seymour. The Price of Power: Kissinger in the Nixon White House. New York City: Summit Books, 1983. 
 Morris, Robert. Haig: The General's Progress.  . 490 pages.

External links

 The Day Reagan was Shot  article on Haig
 The Falklands: Failure of a Mission critique of Haig's mediation efforts
 Portrait of Alexander Haig by Margaret Holland Sargent
 
 
 ANC Explorer

|-

|-

|-

|-

1924 births
2010 deaths
20th-century American memoirists
20th-century American politicians
AOL people
American corporate directors
American people of Irish descent
American people of Scottish descent
Burials at Arlington National Cemetery
Candidates in the 1988 United States presidential election
Columbia Business School alumni
Deaths from staphylococcal infection
Ford administration personnel
Georgetown University Graduate School of Arts and Sciences alumni
Grand Crosses 1st class of the Order of Merit of the Federal Republic of Germany
Hudson Institute
Infectious disease deaths in Maryland
Knights of Malta
Lower Merion High School alumni
Military personnel from Philadelphia
NATO Supreme Allied Commanders
Nixon administration personnel involved in the Watergate scandal
Nixon administration personnel
Pennsylvania Republicans
People from Bala Cynwyd, Pennsylvania
People of the Falklands War
Politicians from Philadelphia
Reagan administration cabinet members
Recipients of the Air Force Distinguished Service Medal
Recipients of the Air Medal
Recipients of the Defense Distinguished Service Medal
Recipients of the Distinguished Flying Cross (United States)
Recipients of the Distinguished Service Cross (United States)
Recipients of the Distinguished Service Medal (US Army)
Recipients of the Gallantry Cross (Vietnam)
Recipients of the Legion of Merit
5 Haig, Alexander
Recipients of the Navy Distinguished Service Medal
Recipients of the Silver Star
St. Joseph's Preparatory School alumni
United States Army Vice Chiefs of Staff
United States Army War College alumni
United States Army generals
United States Army personnel of the Korean War
United States Army personnel of the Vietnam War
United States Deputy National Security Advisors
United States Military Academy alumni
United States Secretaries of State
United States presidential advisors
University of Notre Dame alumni
White House Chiefs of Staff